The Goldendoodle is a designer dog created by crossbreeding a Golden Retriever and a Poodle. First widely bred in the 1990s, they are bred in three different sizes—each corresponding to the size of Poodle used as a parent.

Goldendoodles often demonstrate Golden Retrievers' intuitive and human-oriented nature in addition to the intelligent personality and "allergy-friendly" coat of a Poodle.

History 
In the 1990s designer dog breeders in Australia and the United States (Ryan Harvey) started to widely cross Golden Retrievers and Poodles, adopting the term Goldendoodle to describe the cross. The name Doodle is also used to describe this breed. The name Goldendoodle is derived from "Golden" (from Golden Retriever) and "Labradoodle" (itself a portmanteau of Labrador Retriever and a Poodle). Deliberately breeding Poodles with Golden Retrievers actually preceded the 1990s. An example of this was done by Monica Dickens, the great-granddaughter of Charles Dickens, who crossed the two breeds in 1969. The cross can result in a healthier animal than both parent breeds.

The first litter of Mini Goldendoodles was created by Amy Lane of Fox Creek Farm in Berkeley Springs, WV. The litter arrived on 1/11/02 and consisted of 10 puppies. Two of these puppies were retained for future breeding and one of them produced the first litter of F1B Mini Goldendoodles.  The term "Goldendoodle" was coined by Amy Lane. Amy Lane also created the first, and to this date, the only kennel club for Goldendoodles called the Goldendoodle Association of North America, Inc. This is a non-profit organization that guides the development of the Goldendoodle and also provides a registration service to document the lineage of Goldendoodles.

The original aim of the Goldendoodle's breeders was to produce an alternative to the popular Labradoodle. Initially Goldendoodles were only bred from standard-sized Poodles, but designer breeders also started using small varieties of Poodles to create a smaller crossbreed.  As they are a hybrid cross, they are not recognized by the AKC or British Kennel Clubs. Goldendoodles have been developed beyond the F1 (Golden Retriever crossed with a Poodle) and are now available in deeper generations created by crossing two Goldendoodles.  These are called multigenerational or multigen Goldendoodles.

Characteristics

Appearance 
The appearance, sizes and coat of Goldendoodles can vary considerably according to their breeding generations and what type of Poodle parents they have. Whilst most Goldendoodles share common traits, each Goldendoodle might have its own unique appearance and temperament.

In general, Goldendoodles have round skulls, broad muzzles, heavily feathered tail, drop ears, and oval-shaped eyes. Goldendoodles’ retriever parentage makes their body long and muscular, and likely to have a deep chest and wide stance.

Goldendoodle can be bred from any one of the Standard, Miniature or Toy-sized Poodles, the resultant offspring coming in several sizes: the Standard, Medium and Miniature Goldendoodles.

Goldendoodle is a long-haired dog breed and their coat can vary considerably, there are three main coat types: straight, wavy and curly. Wavy coated Goldendoodles are a combination of the Poodle's curly coat and the Golden Retriever's straight coat. Their coat is wavy, with loose, shaggy curls. This type of coat is the most common amongst Goldendoodles. Curly coated Goldendoodles resemble the coat of a Poodle. Their coat is thick and curly. Goldendoodles' coats come in varying colors, with the most common colors being cream, red, black, gold, apricot, brown, or a combination (parti-colored).

Goldendoodles are often claimed to be 'hypoallergenic' or 'non-shedding', but this depends on how many furnishing genes they carry.  If they inherit just one furnishing gene, their shedding is often in lesser quantities than many other dogs.  If they carry two furnishing genes, they likely will not shed allowing them to be considered hypoallergenic for many allergy sufferers, however some people are allergic to even non-shedding dogs.  Research has shown that hypoallergenicity can not be an official dog breed characteristic. AKC also asserts that "there is no such thing as a completely hypoallergenic dog".

It used to be thought that the higher the percentage of Poodle is in a Goldendoodle's heritage, the less likely it is to shed. It was also thought that curlier coated Goldendoodles tend to shed lighter and produce less dander. However, it has now been determined that the number of furnishing genes a particular dog carries determines the shedding factor.

Behavioural 
Similar to most crossbreed dogs, Goldendoodles tend not to have the same predictable temperament or patterning aspects that the constituent breeds have. Based on genetic theory, well-bred Goldendoodle should express behaviours intermediate to their parent breeds.

In general, Goldendoodles tend to take over Golden Retrievers’ friendly, affectionate, trustworthy and enthusiastic nature; whilst also demonstrating Poodles’ reputable intelligence, sociability and trainability. Goldendoodles predominantly exhibit high energy level, loyalty and playfulness; they are friendly with children and considered a good family pet. Because they are so friendly and loyal, however, they are prone to separation anxiety, especially as puppies. The crossbreed often exhibits strong retriever instincts inherited from its gundog parent breeds, which make them have an active mouth and high tendency to retrieve objects.

A 2019 behavioural study compared Goldendoodles to their parent breeds, on average Goldendoodles displayed greater dog-rivalry, dog-directed aggression, dog-directed fear, and stranger directed fear than purebred Golden Retrievers or Poodles.

Health 
Goldendoodles often present phenotypic advantage over their parent breeds. The pairing of two different breeds can create higher genetic diversity, as well as a lower level of homozygosity. This will minimize the possibility of inheriting undesirable purebred health concerns, and reducing the risks of inbreeding depression. Goldendoodles often benefit from "hybrid vigour", which has a proven positive effect on animal fitness traits that contribute to crossbreeds’ enhanced health and lower susceptibility to diseases.

In general, healthy and well-bred Goldendoodles have a lifespan of 10–15 years. As with all breeds, Goldendoodles are still at risk of developing any possible health conditions associated with Golden Retrievers and Poodles. Some of the potential health-related genetic disorders of Goldendoodles include Hip Dysplasia, Progressive retinal atrophy (PRA), Von Willebrand disease (vWD), Megaesophagus, canine cancer, skin allergies, and ear infection, and have sensitive stomachs.

Popularity and uses 
Primarily bred as companion dogs, Goldendoodles have been successfully trained as therapy dogs, guide dogs, nut-detection dogs detecting nuts in food for people with nut allergies, and other forms of assistance dogs.

In some regions of the United States it has become one of the most popular dog varieties. In Australia, it was named one of the top twenty most popular dog varieties in 2020 where, due to the increased demand for pets during the COVID-19 pandemic, prices for a puppy have risen from around $3,500 AUD pre-pandemic, to as much as $15,000 AUD by September 2020.

In a 2012 charity auction, American musician Usher paid US$12,000 for a Goldendoodle puppy.

See also

 List of dog crossbreeds

References

Dog crossbreeds